A benju (Balochi:  بینجو) a type of zither fitted with a keyboard, commonly used in the music of Balochistan.

Construction and play
It is about 1 meter long, 10 –12 cm wide and the soundbox is about 5 cm high, with six strings. Strings 1 and 2, 5 and 6 are used as bordun (drone) strings and tuned to the tonic and the fifth or fourth. In relative pitch C and G or F. The middle strings 3 and 4 are tuned unison to F or G, and they are fretted and can be shortened by pressing down the metal keys. The scale is chromatic from G to A, B flat or B. The right hand plays the strings by using a wooden or plastic plectron, the left hand is fingering the keys.
	 
The benju is played mainly as a solo instrument accompanied by dholak and tamburag. Sometimes it is combined with sorud.

Benju and Abdulrahman Surizehi

Players
Abd-ur-Rahmân Surizehi, now living in Norway
Abdulrahman Surizehi song

References

External links
 Anne Hytta: Dag, Kveld, Natt. (Sound recording review)
BalochistanMusic blog 
 Mohammad Taghi Mas'udiye. Sâzhâ-ye irân.

Typewriter zithers
Baloch musical instruments